The closing ceremony of the 2022 Winter Paralympics took place at the Beijing National Stadium in Beijing, China, on March 13, 2022.

Preparations
The site of the closing ceremony, the Beijing National Stadium, was redeveloped in preparation for the ceremonies of both the 2022 Winter Olympics and the 2022 Winter Paralympics.

Zhang Yimou is the director of the closing ceremony of the 2022 Winter Paralympics. He is also the director of the opening ceremony as well as the opening and closing ceremonies of the 2022 Winter Olympics.

Entry of countries' and regions' flags & Parade of nations
The flags of the 46 competing nations entered the stadium accompanied by an arrangement of Beethoven's Ode to Joy.

Call of Love Performance

Handover of the Paralympic flag
Anna Scavuzzo and Gianpietro Ghedina, the vice mayors of Milan and Cortina d'Ampezzo, Italy, respectively, were at the closing ceremony for the handover of the Paralympic flag, as the 2026 Winter Paralympics is scheduled to be held in Milan and Cortina d'Ampezzo, Italy.

Milan-Cortina 2026: We are the Light

Dignitaries in attendance

Host nation dignitaries
  People's Republic of China –
 CCP general secretary, CMC chairman and PRC president Xi Jinping 
 CCP Politburo Standing Committee member and PRC premier Li Keqiang
 CCP secretary of Beijing, CCP Politburo member and Organising Committee chairman Cai Qi

International dignitaries
 – Vice Mayor of Milan Anna Scavuzzo
 - Vice-Mayor of Cortina d'Ampezzo Gianpietro Ghedina

Dignitaries from International organizations
  and   International Paralympic Committee – President Andrew Parsons

Anthems
 National Anthem of People's Republic of China
 Paralympic Hymn
 National Anthem of Italy

See also
2022 Winter Olympics opening ceremony
2022 Winter Olympics closing ceremony
2022 Winter Paralympics opening ceremony

References

External Links
 

Closing Ceremony
Ceremonies in China
Paralympics closing ceremonies